The Quetta Bears was a domestic T20 and List A team, based in Quetta, Balochistan, Pakistan. The team was established in 2004 and its home ground was Bugti Stadium.

See also
 Pakistan Super League

References

External links
Twenty 20 Record page for Quetta Bears
Cricketarchive page for Quetta Bears

Cricket clubs established in 2006
2006 establishments in Pakistan
Cricket teams in Pakistan
Bears
Sport in Balochistan, Pakistan